Cumbia rap  is a spin-off of the original cumbia genre. It consists of a more traditional Colombian rhythm, as well as some hip hop and reggae type additions. Pioneers of cumbia rap include Crooked Stilo from Los Angeles, El Gran Silencio from Nuevo Leon, Santa Fe Klan from Guanajuato, Chicos de Barrio from Coahuila, in Argentina, as well as the Kumbia Kings from Texas.

Early Tex-Mex or Onda Chicana acts such as La Mafia, La Sombra, and Selena y Los Dinos experimented with rap lyrics over cumbia beats in the late 1980s and early 1990s.

Other exponents of the genre from Argentina include cumbia villera/rap fusion band "Bajo Palabra" and Kumbia Queers.

References

20th-century music genres
Cumbia music genres
Hip hop genres